Beauvais is a city in Picardy, France.

Beauvais may also refer to:

AS Beauvais Oise, French football club
Arrondissement of Beauvais, arrondissement of France
Beauvais Cathedral
Beauvais (surname)
Beauvais Lake (Alberta), lake in Alberta, Canada

See also
Beauvais tapestry, French tapestry